Petreni is a commune in Drochia District, Moldova. It is composed of two villages, Petreni and Popeștii Noi. At the 2004 census, the commune had 1,179 inhabitants.

History 
Petreni is a renowned settlement of Cucuteni-Trypillian culture.

Notable people
 Eugeniu Știrbu

References 

Communes of Drochia District